Dash Alti (also Romanized as Dāsh Āltī) is a village in Baruq Rural District, Baruq District, Miandoab County, West Azerbaijan Province, Iran. At the 2006 census, its population was 40, in 8 families.

References 

Populated places in Miandoab County